Telekids is a Dutch children's television programme showing on the RTL 4 channel from 1989 to 1999 and since 2010 on RTL 8.

The show first aired on October 2, 1989, at 6:25pm, after the six o'clock news. Initially only Irene Moors presented the program and it was broadcast every day. To add even more strength, Carlo Boszhard joined in 1993, after which the program's popularity increased. From then on, Telekids was broadcast live every Saturday morning between 7am and 12 noon. Later all cartoons were pushed back to the start, causing the studio program to start at 9am. In the early days Telekids was co-hosted by Manon Thomas, Marc Postelmans and Caroline Tensen. These presenters filled in in the absence of Moors. Telekids was also presented in its early years by Marcel de Nijs and Bart Bosch. They quickly disappeared, as presenter Anniko van Santen started presenting the weekday broadcasts of Telekids from 1992. After the weekday broadcasts were canceled, van Santen presented the Telekids-derived programs Cartoon Express (1993–1999) and Teleteens. When the broadcasting association Veronica joined RTL as a channel in 1995, Teleteens became NOW TV. This program aired on both Saturday and Sunday and was hosted by Danny Rook. Later, Now TV and all teen series moved to Veronica's own channel. During the same period, Rook did several live location items for Telekids on Saturday mornings.

The program was off the air between 1999 and 2010. On August 19, 2010, it was announced that Telekids would return to television, but on RTL 8. Since 18 October 2010, RTL Telekids can be seen every morning on RTL 8. On September 3, 2012, Telekids started its own digital channel (RTL Telekids), which can be received via Ziggo and Caiway.

History

Classic Telekids
Telekids was broadcast from Luxembourg in the first season and later moved to the large studio in Hilversum. In the early years it was therefore a program that was broadcast daily, in which cartoons and live-action series (such as Transformers, Batman, The Raccoons, Little Wizards, Happy Days, My Secret Identity and Maple Town) were interspersed with studio segments. Such segments on weekdays weren't live, but were recorded on weekends. The 1000th broadcast of the program was broadcast in April 1992, with Boszhard having one of his first appearances. In the spring of 1993 Boszhard returned again, because he replaced Moors.

During the first season, longer movies for teenagers were broadcast. On one occasion the Czech movie The Firemen's Ball was broadcast by accident. The mistake was quickly identified but due to bad contact with the control room in Luxembourg, the movie was interrupted nearly one hour after it started.

Starting with the 1993–1994 television season, Telekids switched to the formula for which it became best known: cartoons alternated with the live studio segments of Boszhard and Moors every Saturday morning between 7 and 12 noon. Parts included Giegel and Goochel, the Mega Blubber Power Race, We are better, Spot Light, Girl Secrets and Carlo's Crisis. The broadcasts during the week, now presented by van Santen, were canceled. The Sunday morning was filled with many cartoons in the Cartoon Express, presented by van Santen. Around 11 o'clock the program turned into Teleteens in which films and series for teenagers were shown. Van Santen presented this program (which was similar to the Cartoon Express setup) as well. It contained cartoons and series about dinosaurs. This hour was also presented by van Santen.

From September 1996, the cartoons were mainly placed in a block until 9am, after which the studio slot started and was interrupted only once or twice by cartoons or series. Pittige Tijden ensured that the audience that watched Telekids became much wider, the part was mainly popular among students.

When Boszhard and Moors just presented the program together, they pretended to be each other's lovers. Telekids songs hinted at their relationship. On December 31, 1994, an episode was even shown in which it was played that they married each other. As the seasons progressed, the public largely knew that Boszhard was gay and eventually revealed that Moors was pregnant with her actual boyfriend. The love affair of the duo therefore slowly faded into the background and turned into an ordinary friendship.

A number of CDs have also been released under the Telekids banner. The duo Carlo & Irene received a gold record in 1997 with a reissue of the Telekids CD from 1995 (with the hit single "Pittige Tijden"). Irene's earlier CDs from the solo era were also awarded; the 1992 CD  received a gold record for 65,000 copies sold.

Current Telekids
On August 19, 2010, RTL indicated that the name Telekids would be used for a new youth block on RTL 8.

Originally the new program was to start on October 4, 2010. However, three days before that, a collision took place on the A59 in which a woman and three children were killed on their way to Efteling, where recordings would take place for the program , one of the new Telekids segments. Therefore the start of Telekids was postponed for two weeks until October 18, 2010, out of respect for the victims.

Since September 26, 2011, Telekids has been running longer and is also broadcast in the afternoons (every Monday to Friday from 6:30am to 5:00pm and on weekends from 6:30am to 5:00pm). Since September 3, 2013, there is also a digital channel called Telekids 24/7.

References

External links
 RTL 4's Official Website

Dutch children's television series
1980s Dutch television series
1990s Dutch television series
1989 Dutch television series debuts
1999 Dutch television series endings
RTL 4 original programming
Television programming blocks in Europe